Kinkora Regional High School, is a Canadian secondary school in Kinkora, Prince Edward Island. It was the first rural high school in PEI. The school draws students from the communities of Borden-Carleton, Bedeque, Emerald, Middleton, and Kinkora.

See also
List of schools in Prince Edward Island
List of school districts in Prince Edward Island

References 

High schools in Prince Edward Island
Schools in Prince County, Prince Edward Island
Educational institutions established in 1935
1935 establishments in Prince Edward Island